Corning Memorial Stadium is a stadium in Corning, New York. Dedicated on September 12, 1948, it was primarily used for baseball until 1969  and was home to the Corning Independents. It holds 3,000 people. It is currently leased by the Corning-Painted Post Area School District  and is frequently used for high school football, lacrosse, soccer games, as well as two annual marching band shows.

References 

O'Reilly, Charles. "Memorial Stadium, Corning, N.Y.", Retrieved on 2007-11-10.
"Corning-Painted Post Area School District School Board Policy Public Use Of School Facilities", Retrieved on 2007-11-10.

Sports venues in New York (state)
Minor league baseball venues
Baseball venues in New York (state)
Sports venues in Steuben County, New York
1948 establishments in New York (state)
Sports venues completed in 1948
High school football venues in the United States
Lacrosse venues in New York (state)
Soccer venues in New York (state)